Alexander Max Koester (10 February 1864, Bergneustadt - 21 December 1932, Munich) was a German landscape and animal painter. He specialized in scenes with ducks.

Life and work

His father was a hosiery manufacturer. In 1882, following his parents' wishes, he began an apprenticeship at a pharmacy in Winzenheim (now in France). As a student, he supported himself by painting portraits, but he later focused on landscapes.

He spent the decade from 1885 to 1895 making study trips: to the Black Forest, the Vosges, Munich, and Tyrolia. While visiting the town of Klausen, a gathering place for artists, he met Isabella Kantioler, the daughter of an innkeeper. They were married in 1893. After completing his studies, in 1896, they settled in Klausen. He had first became interested in ducks while observing a colony of them that belonged to his father-in-law. In addition to painting them, he studied their anatomy and behavior.

He soon became an expert on duck breeds and breeding. His portraits of them became very popular. It was said that he charged for his works according to the number of ducks in the picture. One of them was acquired by Kaiser Wilhelm II in 1900. The art school in Darmstadt offered him a position, but he declined, preferring to work free-lance. To gain better access to his buyers, he rented a studio in Munich, where he worked during the summer. He also became a member of the artist's cooperative there. In 1902, he won a small gold medal at the Große Berliner Kunstausstellung; and another at the Louisiana Purchase Exposition in 1904.

In 1915, Klausen was declared to be part of a war zone, and his house was confiscated. He moved to Dießen am Ammersee and set up a new studio. His son had been killed not long after the war started. After that, he focused on landscapes and still-lifes, but never lost his interest in ducks. Most of his works outside of private collections are held at the Neue Pinakothek in Munich.

References

Further reading 
 Ruth Stein, Hans Koester: Alexander Koester 1864–1932. Leben und Werk. Bongers, Recklinghausen 1988, 
 Alexander Koester: Werke aus der Schenkung Else Eckhard, Exhibition catalog, Neue Pinakothek, Hirmer, Munich 1985,

External links 

 Biography @ the Koester Foundation
 More works by Koester @ ArtNet
 
 Biography and works @ The World Artist

1864 births
1932 deaths
19th-century German painters
19th-century German male artists
German landscape painters
German painters of animals
Academy of Fine Arts, Karlsruhe
People from Bergneustadt
20th-century German painters
20th-century German male artists